Texas Instruments personal computer, TI PC, TI home computer, and similar phrases may refer to:
 TI-99/4A and TI-99/4, the first 16-bit home computers (1979–1983)
 Compact Computer 40, a small portable computer introduced in 1983
 Texas Instruments Professional Computer (TIPC or TI PC), a personal computer that used the DOS operating system but was not fully compatible with the IBM PC (1983 –  1985)
 Texas Instruments Professional Portable Computer, a contemporaneous portable version of the TI Professional Computer